BTS Rekord Bielsko-Biała is a Polish futsal club based in Bielsko-Biała.

History 
The club BTS Lipnik Bielsko-Biała was founded in 1994 by the support of Janusz Szymura, president of the music label "Rekord", at an amateur football club based in the Lipnik district. While still maintaining the football section, the company immediately focuses on 5-a-side football, making it one of the founders of the national championship. Except for the 1999-00 season (in which the 5-a-side football section did not take part in any championships), the Silesian company played in Ekstraklasa from 1994 to 2006, when it was relegated to the second division. In May 2000, the club changed its name to the BTS Rekord Lipnik Bielsko-Biała. In June 2001, the club changed its name to the BTS Bielsko-Biała Record. The return in the top flight in 2009 coincides with the beginning of a winning cycle that projects the Rekord to the top of the Polish pentacalcio. In the 2012-13 season the team led by Andrea Bucciol won the Polish Cup which represents the first national trophy of the company; in the following season the technical conduction passed to Adam Kryger, who won the championship and the Super Cup. At the UEFA Futsal Cup debut, the Rekord reaches the main round where he still gets a victory (against the emblazoned Iberia Star Tbilisi and two defeats that decree the elimination.

Current squad 
''Last Update: 9 March 2023

Honours
Polish Futsal League:  6x: 2013-14, 2016–17, 2017–18, 2018–19, 2019–20, 2020–21
Polish Futsal Cup: 3x: 2012-13, 2017–18, 2018–19
Polish Futsal Supercup: 2x: 2013, 2017

European competitions record

References

External links
 Official Website
 Club in 90 minutes base

Futsal clubs in Poland
Sport in Bielsko-Biała
Futsal clubs established in 1994
1994 establishments in Poland